Argentina at the 1920 Summer Olympics in Antwerp, Belgium was the nation's third appearance out of six editions of the Summer Olympic Games. Argentina last participated at the 1908 Summer Olympics. Argentina sent to the 1920 Summer Olympics another team of one repeating the trend from its representative teams of 1900 and 1908 Summer Olympics. The national team was organized under the auspices of the Athletic Federation of Chile.

Boxing 

Ángel Rodríguez made Argentina's Summer Olympic Games debut in the sport of boxing being the nation's only boxing representative at the 1920 Games. He was defeated in the first round of competition.

References

 
 

Nations at the 1920 Summer Olympics
1920
Olympics